Krack is a 2021 Indian Telugu-language action thriller film directed by Gopichand Malineni, who wrote the script with the dialogues by Sai Madhav Burra. It stars Ravi Teja, Shruti Haasan, Samuthirakani, and Varalaxmi Sarathkumar. Produced by B. Madhu under Saraswathi Films Division banner and based on multiple true incidents that took place in the states of Andhra Pradesh and Telangana, the film depicts the conflict between a circle inspector and a gangster. The film's narrative style is inspired from 2018 Kannada film Tagaru.

After the launch at a formal ceremony on 14 November 2019 at Hyderabad, principal photography commenced on 21 November 2019, and ended on 7 December 2020, with production delays due to the COVID-19 pandemic. The film features music scored by Thaman S, with cinematography by G. K. Vishnu, and editing by Naveen Nooli.

Krack was released theatrically on 9 January 2021, and opened to highly positive reviews from critics who appreciated the performances and writing. The film was commercially successful, grossing 6070 crore at the box office.

Plot 
Venkatesh narrates that a  note, a green mango, and a nail resemble the fate of three persons who come across a cop. A BBC journalist arrives at a jail in Delhi to interview Saleem Batkal, a convict responsible for Mumbai blasts, but Saleem demands money from the interviewer, which to their astonishment is just . 

Upon taking it, he tells that he rented a house that is  cheaper than the previous one due to a scuffle between the owner and broker. The house Saleem rents at Kurnool for passport verification with fake details falls under the jurisdiction of Shankar's police station, where Saleem's men have no influence. After a dramatic turn of events, he is caught by Shankar, who notices the details Salim gave are fake. When Saleem tries to warn about his background, Shankar beats him up and arrests him.

In Kadapa, Konda Reddy, a highly sadistic goon, occupies the land of a doctor. When Konda Reddy is in a meeting, a girl tries to pluck from a mango tree in his yard, for which he angrily unleashes his dogs upon her. The girl is injured, and her mother files suit on him. The SP calls Konda Reddy, telling that this case might put Konda Reddy in trouble because it will be dealt with by CI Shankar. Konda takes him lightly, but the SP insists him to meet Katari Krishna, who is in the central jail of Rajahmundry. 

Katari appears as a regular prisoner, but Konda Reddy is intrigued when he learns about Katari's criminal record. Upon asking, Katari narrates his story that he rose to power by creating a bloodshed in Ongole, and is jailed later because of a nail. Shankar is appointed as CI of Ongole, and meets constable Kiran, the son of a constable who used to work with Shankar. Jayamma, a close aide of Katari's, has a habit of going to the cinema on Fridays. 

Jayamma sees Katari's daughter with Kiran, and gets him grotesquely murdered by appointing men from Vetapalem. Shankar investigates about the murder, while relishing his memories with Kiran. He finds out that Katari was accused for a similar kind of murder a few years ago. At a village fair, Shankar goes to bring Katari to the police station for enquiry, Katari warns Shankar of his background, which irritates Shankar and gets him arrested.

Katari is released when Jayamma gets him a bail, but they are stunned to know that his daughter married another police constable. That night at the cinema hall, her boyfriend's leg is accidentally pierced by a nail, due to which Kiran drops her at the house. Unaware of this, Jayamma misinterprets Kiran to be her boyfriend. During their wedding reception, Katari's wife requests the couple to leave the town to be safe. She, however, conspires to kill her daughter's husband. 

Katari's men attack them at the bus station, but Shankar saves them. A man caught there named Jayamma was the perpetrator. Knowing this, Katari asks his men to kill Jayamma, so that his name does not come out. Jayamma is killed by the time Shankar arrives to arrest her. While chasing the killers, he shoots one of them, but  accidentally kills an innocent bystander. Shankar is suspended, but during his private investigation, he learns that his associate Tilak had killed that innocent, as he was on Katari's payroll. 

Shankar gets hold of all the evidence against Katari that Tilak has. Katari tries to warn Shankar by attacking his family, but his wife Kalyani, a former police officer, is able to defend them. Shankar rejoins his job and fights with Vetapalem gang members, and kills all of them at the beach. And Shankar tracks down Katari to arrest him. Katari tries to escape by boarding a lorry, but its tyre gets punctured by a nail, and he is caught.

After learning this, Konda Reddy makes sure that he does not use the word "background" in front of Shankar, and treats him with respect, but his assistant hurriedly comes and utters the word. Shankar thrashes him and puts him in the same jail where Katari is kept. Saleem, now transferred to that jail, tells them he is trying to seek revenge on Shankar. They both laugh it off.

Cast

Production

Development 
On 26 October 2019, Ravi Teja announced his 66th film as an actor with the tentative title RT 66, which would be directed by Gopichand Malineni, marking the third collaboration between Teja and Malineni after their previous films Don Seenu (2010) and Balupu (2013). Prior to commencement of the shoot, Gopichand Malieni claimed the film was neither inspired by nor a remake of any film. He described it as "an original story based on several true incidents happened in the Telugu states." On 14 November 2019, the makers announced the title of the film as Krack.

Casting 
Shruti Haasan was chosen as the lead actress alongside Ravi Teja, making it their second collaboration after Balupu. Originally, she took a break from acting in Telugu films, after Pawan Kalyan's Katamarayudu (2017), made her comeback in the Telugu film industry with this film. Tamil film actress Varalaxmi Sarathkumar was chosen to play a key role, making it her second Telugu film after Tenali Ramakrishna BA. BL (2019). Samuthirakani similarly joined the cast, collaborating with Ravi Teja after Shambo Shiva Shambo (2010). Thaman S was roped in to compose the music for the film, while cinematographer G. K. Vishnu, editor Naveen Nooli and action choreographer duo Ram-Lakshman, were also a part of the technical crew.

Filming 
The film was launched on 14 November 2019 at the Film Nagar Temple. Producer Allu Aravind attended as the chief guest and did the honours. The principal photography commenced on 21 November 2019 in Ramoji Film City. Around late November, the makers filmed a Jatara episode featuring Ravi Teja and hundreds of supporting actors. During the shoot in early January 2020, director A. R. Murugadoss visited the film's sets in Hyderabad. The film's shoot was further interrupted due to the COVID-19 pandemic lockdown in India.

On 7 October 2020, Ravi Teja announced that he had resumed the shooting of the film at Ramoji Film City in Hyderabad, after lockdown, adhering to the safety guidelines imposed by the government in order to curb the coronavirus pandemic. On 15 October, the makers filmed a song shoot, featuring Anketa Maharana and Teja and the song being choreographed by Jani Master. Varalakshmi Sarathkumar, completed her portions in late October. On 2 December, Ravi Teja tweeted about the final schedule of the film held in Goa, which features a song shoot choreographed by Raju Sundaram. Filming wrapped up on 5 December 2020.

Music 

The film's music is composed by Thaman S, and lyrics for the songs were written by Ramajogayya Sastry and Kasarla Shyam. The film marks the second collaboration of Ravi Teja, Thaman and Gopichand Malineni after Balupu (2013). In May 2020, a fake Twitter handle of the film's director, announced an update about the first single, whereas the composer refuted such claims and asked the fans to wait for the official announcement.

The first single, "Bhoom Bhaddhal", was released on 13 November 2020, coinciding with the eve of Diwali. On 10 December 2020, the makers tweeted about the second single, which will be sung by noted Tamil film composer Anirudh Ravichander, which was later titled as "Balega Tagilavey Bangaram" and was released on 14 December 2020. The third single track "Korameesam Polisoda" was released on the occasion of Christmas, 25 December 2020. The fourth song of the film titled "Mass Biriyani" was unveiled on 4 January 2021.

Lahari Music released the complete soundtrack album featuring five tracks on 8 January 2021, which included the four songs that were released as singles earlier.

Reception 
123Telugu, on reviewing the music, stated, "On the whole. the album of Krack is made for the target audience. Thaman, though, does not give something special, but plays it to the galleries and brings out his massy side with some foot-tapping numbers. Mass Biryani and Balega Tagilyave Bangaram are our picks and will be big hits. As it has been quite some time since we have seen a mass film on the screen, this album will surely pick once the film releases on the big screen."

Another reviewer from IndiaGlitz rated the album 3 out of 5 stars, and wrote, "The Thaman-Anirudh combination sounds refreshing, with the scales tilting towards the latter. It's as if the singer exerted a heavy influence in determining the flavour of the song rather than allow the musician to do it. The liberal usage of English-language words like 'Family pack' has a Bhaskarabhatla-esque ring to them. Besides the self-referential word 'Balupu' (which was a film of the Gopichand Malineni-Ravi Teja duo), there are too many cliches out there. Sahithi Chaganti's voice trods the beaten path. Rahul Nambiar's voice is energetic. Thaman deploys the drums and percussions in a typical manner."

Allegations of plagiarism 
Despite no copyright issues, the song "Balega Tagilyave Bangaram" composed by Thaman, was criticised for allegedly copying the tunes from a Latin song "Selva". Another allegation was raised stating that "Mass Biryani" song has similar tunes from the song "Kajal Chellivaa" of  2013 Telugu film Balupu, which was composed by himself starring same trio, Ravi Teja, Shruti Haasan, and Gopichand Malineni.

Release

Theatrical 
Krack was scheduled to release theatrically on 8 May 2020, but was postponed due to the COVID-19 pandemic. The director Gopichand Malineni, clarified that the film will be scheduled for a theatrical release, after rumours regarding the film's release on OTT platforms surfaced. On 26 October 2020, the makers announced that the film will release theatrically during the occasion of Sankranthi.

On 19 December 2020, the makers announced that the film would release on 14 January 2021, coinciding with Sankranthi. However, at the launch event held at AMB Cinemas in Hyderabad on 1 January 2021, where the film's trailer was released, director Gopichand Malineni announced a new release date of 9 January 2021. The pre-release business of the film in the Telugu states considered to be  crore from the Telugu states alone.

The film's US premiere shows on 8 January, and the morning and afternoon shows in India were cancelled, due to the financial tussles between the exhibitors and its producer B. Madhu. The financiers reportedly took the legal route to stall the release of the film, demanding that producer Madhu, had to clear the dues owed by them, after the failure of his Vishal-starrer Ayogya (2019). After clearing the negotiations, the makers premiered evening shows of the film.

Home media 
The film was released on OTT platform Aha on 6 February 2021. The satellite rights of the film were acquired by Star Maa, premiered on 14 March 2021 and registered an average TRP rating of 11.7. The Hindi version premiered first on Miniplex TV channel on 4 June 2021 and then on Zee Cinema on 27 June 2021. However the dubbing of the Hindi dub premiered on Miniplex was panned by the viewers, especially that of Ravi Teja's. The second Hindi dub with Amar Babaria's voice for Ravi Teja was premiered on Zee Cinema. The Tamil version of the film was telecast through Zee Tamil on 1 August 2021.

Reception

Critical response 
Krack received positive reviews from the critics, with most praising "the effective performances and the engaging screenplay." The Times of India critic Thadhagath Pathi gave 3.5 out of 5 stars, stating, "A wholesome commercial cop drama and mass entertainer from Mass Maharaj himself after a very long time." 123Telugu gave 3.25 out of 5 stating "Krack is a full-on masala entertainer with Ravi Teja in top form." Hemanth Kumar of Firstpost gave the film a rating of 3 out of 5 stating "The biggest crack in Krack is evident in its attempt to build a gripping narrative. Each sequence is packed with so many details, some of which just look cool without adding anything to the narrative, that you begin to lose patience." Indiaglitz gave the film 3 out of 5 stating "Krack is targeted at the mass audience and youngsters who pine for hero-can-do-it-all stories. While being formulaic, it also offers several exciting stretches."

Karthik Keramalu of Film Companion stated, "It’s fun to watch the Mass Maharaja in Gopichand Malineni’s crowd-pleaser that’s tailor-made for his energetic presence." He also noted that a magnanimous chunk of the narrative device from the 2018 Kannada movie Tagaru to be the main source of inspiration for the template of the tweaked screenplay of this film. Janani K of India Today gave 3 out of 5 stars "Krack is a decent masala entertainer with a neat blend of commercial elements, brilliant stunt sequences, and interesting storyline. The film could have been so much more if they had done away with too much detailing. Yet, Krack holds the audience’s attention for the most part and entertains us."

Box office 
The morning and noon shows for Krack were cancelled, and the film opened with evening shows. The film grossed 10 crore in its first two days, with a distributor share of over 6 crore. At the third day, the film grossed more than 2.81 crore, taking its total opening weekend collections to 23 crore. In 15 days, Krack grossed , becoming the highest-grossing film of Teja's career. The film earned distributors a share of 36.23  crore.

Notes

References

External links 

2020s Telugu-language films
2021 action thriller films
2021 films
Action films based on actual events
Film productions suspended due to the COVID-19 pandemic
Films directed by Gopichand Malineni
Films set in Andhra Pradesh
Films set in Kurnool
Films set in Rajahmundry
Films shot in Andhra Pradesh
Films shot in Rajahmundry
Films shot in Telangana
Indian action thriller films
Indian films based on actual events
Indian police films
Films scored by Thaman S